William George McNulty (born 9 February 1949) is a Scottish former football goalkeeper. He played a total of eight league games between 1966 and 1970, one each for Port Vale and Berwick Rangers, and six for Chesterfield.

Career
McNulty graduated through the juniors to sign professional forms with Port Vale in April 1966. Manager Jackie Mudie handed him his Fourth Division debut in a 2–0 defeat by Aldershot at Vale Park on 22 April 1967. He did not feature again for the "Valiants", and was given a free transfer to Chesterfield in May 1968. He played six Fourth Division games for the "Spireites" in 1968–69, before manager Jimmy McGuigan allowed him to leave Saltergate. He played one Scottish Second Division game for Harry Melrose's Berwick Rangers in 1969–70, before leaving Shielfield Park and retiring from professional football.

Career statistics
Source:

References

1949 births
Living people
Footballers from Edinburgh
Scottish footballers
Association football goalkeepers
Port Vale F.C. players
Chesterfield F.C. players
Berwick Rangers F.C. players
English Football League players
Scottish Football League players